Mariana Mincheva (born 6 November 1959) is a Bulgarian rower. She competed in the women's eight event at the 1980 Summer Olympics.

References

1959 births
Living people
Bulgarian female rowers
Olympic rowers of Bulgaria
Rowers at the 1980 Summer Olympics
Place of birth missing (living people)